Sierra Otomi  Highland Otomi (Otomi de la Sierra) is a dialect cluster of the Otomi language spoken in Mexico by ca. 70,000 people in the highlands of Eastern Hidalgo, Western Veracruz and Northern Puebla. The speakers themselves call the language Yųhų (Eastern Highland) or Ñųhų (Texcatepec and Tenango). Lastra 2001 classifies it as an Eastern Otomi language together with Ixtenco Otomi, Tilapa Otomi, and Acazulco Otomi. The three varieties of Sierra Otomi—Eastern Highland, Texcatepec, and Tenango—are above 70% lexically similar; the Eastern Highland dialects are above 80%, and will be considered here.

Distribution
Municipalities with significant Sierra Otomi populations include the following (Dow 2005:236). Many of these municipalities also have Tepehua, Totonac, and Nahuatl speakers.

Hidalgo
Acaxochitlan
Huehuetla
San Bartolo Tutotepec
Tenango de Doria
Tulancingo

Puebla
Francisco Z. Mena
Pahuatlán
Pantepec
Tlacuilotepec
Tlaxco

Veracruz
Benito Juárez
Chicóntepec
Coatzintla
Coyutla
Huayacocotla
Ixhuatlán de Madero
Temapache
Texcatepec
Tihuatlán
Tlachichilco
Zacualpan

Phonology
The phonemic inventory given below is based on the particular phonology of the Otomi de la Sierra dialect as documented by Voigtlander and Echegoyen (1985), phonemic inventories of other dialects vary slightly from that of Otomi de la Sierra.

Consonants

Vowels

Orthography

Alphabet
 a - [ɑ]
 a̱, ä - [ɔ]
 b - [b]
 ch - [t͡ʃ]
 d - [d]
 e - [e]
 e̱, ë - [ɛ]
 f - [ɸ]
 g - [g]
 h - [h]
 i - [i]
 j - [x]
 k - [k]
 l - [l]
 m - [m]
 n - [n]
 ñ - [ɲ]
 o - [ɔ/o]
 o̱ - [ø]
 p - [p]
 r - [ɾ]
 s - [s]
 t - [t]
 th - [θ]
 ts - [t͡s]
 u - [u/w]
 u̱, ʉ - [ʉ/ɨ]
 x - [ʃ]
 y - [j]
 z - [z/d͡z]

Other letters
 ą - [ɑ̃]
 ę - [ɛ̃]
 į - [ĩ]
 ǫ - [ɔ̃]
 ų - [ũ]

Tones
Tones are usually not marked.
 a - low tone
 á - high tone
 ǎ - rising tone
 à - falling tone

Notes

References

Dow, James W. 2005. "The Sierra Ñähñu (Otomí)." In Sandstrom, Alan R., and Enrique Hugo García Valencia. 2005. Native peoples of the Gulf Coast of Mexico. Tucson: University of Arizona Press.

 

Otomi language